Nick Marck is an American television director.

He has worked on a number of episodes from the television series Veronica Mars, Northern Exposure, Buffy the Vampire Slayer and The Wonder Years. Some of his other directing credits include Monk, Gilmore Girls, Malcolm in the Middle, Dawson's Creek, The X-Files, Charmed and Mr. and Mrs. Smith.

Marck has also directed two films, The Jungle Book: Mowgli's Story (1998) and National Lampoon's Christmas Vacation 2: Cousin Eddie's Island Adventure (2003).

References

External links

American film directors
American television directors
Hugo Award winners
Living people
Place of birth missing (living people)
Year of birth missing (living people)